Garratt is the surname of:

Chris Garratt, artist of the Biff (cartoon) team
Fred Garratt (1888–1967), English footballer
Herbert William Garratt (1864–1913), mechanical engineer, inventor of the Garratt locomotive type
Humphry Garratt (1898–1974), English cricketer
Martin Garratt (born 1980), English footballer
Nick Garratt, Australian rowing coach
Owen Garratt (born 1968), Canadian artist and musician
Steve Garratt (born 1953), English cricket umpire
Wayne Garratt (1968–1992), English speedway rider

See also
Garrett
Garret (given name)